Argonne may refer to:
The Forest of Argonne, France
Argonne National Laboratory, a U.S. D.O.E. National Laboratory near Chicago, Illinois
Meuse-Argonne Offensive, also called the Battle of Argonne Forest, a World War I battle
Argonne, South Dakota, a ghost town in the United States
Argonne, Wisconsin, a town, US
Argonne (CDP), Wisconsin, an unincorporated community, US
 , built in 1916 at Kobe, Japan, by the Kawasaki Dockyards.
 , originally designated AP-4 and commissioned 8 November 1921.
Argonne (automobile), a short-lived U.S. car company 
Argonne Rebels, an inactive DCI Division I drum and bugle corps from Great Bend, Kansas
Hotel Argonne, a historic hotel in downtown Lima, Ohio, United States